El Libertario (English: The Libertarian) is the title of several Spanish-language anarchist journals. Some journals which have taken this name are:

 El Libertario (Argentina), published by the Argentine Libertarian Federation
 El Libertario (Venezuela), published by the Commission of Anarchist Relations